Rolando Barra (born March 10, 1987) is a Bolivian football defender. He currently plays for Sport Boys in the Liga de Fútbol Profesional Boliviano.

External links
 

1987 births
Living people
Association football defenders
Bolivian footballers
La Paz F.C. players
Oriente Petrolero players
People from Santa Cruz de la Sierra
The Strongest players
Universitario de Sucre footballers